Maple Lake Municipal Airport  is a city-owned, public-use airport located one nautical mile (2 km) northeast of the central business district of Maple Lake, a city in Wright County, Minnesota, United States. It is located on Maple Lake and is also known as Maple Lake Municipal Airport & Seaplane Base.   The current full name is now Maple Lake Municipal - Bill Mavencamp Sr Field.

Although most U.S. airports use the same three-letter location identifier for the FAA and IATA, Maple Lake Municipal Airport is assigned MGG by the FAA but has no designation from the IATA (which assigned MGG to Margarima, Papua New Guinea).

The Maple Lake Flying club was formed in 1965 with the goal of establishing an airport in the city.  In June 1967 the airport opened.

Facilities and aircraft 
It has one runway designated 10/28 with a 2,796 x 60 ft (852 x 18 m) asphalt surface. It also has one seaplane landing area designated 4W/22W which measures 8,000 x 2,000 ft (2,438 x 610 m).

For the 12-month period ending June 30, 2007, the airport had 20,800 aircraft operations, an average of 56 per day: 91% general aviation, 5% air taxi and 4% military. At that time there were 54 aircraft based at this airport: 76% single-engine, 13% multi-engine and 11% ultralight.

References

External links 
 page at Minnesota DOT Airport Directory

Airports in Minnesota
Seaplane bases in the United States
Buildings and structures in Wright County, Minnesota
Transportation in Wright County, Minnesota